Aborolabis cerrobarjai is a species of earwig in the genus Aborolabis, the family Anisolabididae, the suborder Forficulina, and the order Dermaptera.

References 

Anisolabididae
Insects described in 1879